Barbra Streisand's Greatest Hits is the first greatest hits album recorded by American vocalist Barbra Streisand. It was released on January 1, 1970, by Columbia Records. The record is a compilation consisting of 11 commercially successful singles from the singer's releases in the 1960s, with a majority of them being cover songs. The songs on Barbra Streisand's Greatest Hits originally appeared on one of the singer's eight previous albums and span in release from 1963 to 1968. It contains her most commercially successful tracks, including her first Billboard Hot 100 top ten single "People" and top 40 entry "Second Hand Rose". The album was distributed on compact disc in 1986 and rereleased under the title The Hits in 2006.

Well received by music critics, Barbra Streisand's Greatest Hits received a five star rating from Rolling Stone. It was also praised by AllMusic's William Ruhlmann, who found the album crucial to reinventing Streisand's career. The album charted in Canada, the United Kingdom, and the United States, peaking at numbers 17, 44, and 32, respectively. It was later certified double Platinum by the Recording Industry Association of America (RIAA) for shipments of two million copies. The album also received a Gold certification in Australia. A second compilation consisting of Streisand's hits from the 1970s, was released in 1978 and titled Barbra Streisand's Greatest Hits Volume 2.

Background and release 
Barbra Streisand's Greatest Hits was released on January 1, 1970, through Barbra Streisand's record label, Columbia Records. A retrospective collection, it contains 11 singles from the singer's first decade in the recording industry, ranging from "My Coloring Book" (1963) to "Happy Days Are Here Again" (1968). The material was recorded between 1963 and 1968 and originally included on five of her studio albums, the two Funny Girl recordings (original cast album and film soundtrack), and her first live album – A Happening in Central Park (1968). Featuring her most commercially successful songs, the album features one Billboard Hot 100 top ten single ("People"), one top 40 single ("Second Hand Rose"), and seven of Streisand's lower-charting releases: "Free Again", "Gotta Move", "He Touched Me", "My Man", "Sam, You Made the Pants Too Long", and "Why Did I Choose You". The compilation also included three non-charting songs – "Don't Rain on My Parade", "Happy Days Are Here Again", and "My Coloring Book". The version of "Happy Days Are Here Again" that appears on Barbra Streisand's Greatest Hits was recorded live during her A Happening in Central Park concert in 1968. The album's 11 tracks were produced by a variety of musicians, including Mike Berniker, Jack Gold, Robert Mersey, Ettore Stratta, and Warren Vincent.

The compilation was also printed on 8-track cartridges where it was distributed with the same track listing in a revised order. On January 26, 1986, Barbra Streisand's Greatest Hits was released for the first time on CD. Since its first appearance on CDs, it has been reissued on several occasions. In 2006, Sony Music Entertainment and BMG Rights Management repackaged the album under the name The Hits, featuring the same track listing and similar front artwork. A second compilation consisting of Streisand's hits from the 1970s, was released in 1978 and aptly titled Barbra Streisand's Greatest Hits Volume 2.

Critical reception 

Barbra Streisand's Greatest Hits received praise from music critics. William Ruhlmann from AllMusic appreciated Streisand's decision to release a greatest hits album as he felt the singer's "career was in decline" and in need of improvement; he also favored the album's live rendition inclusion of "Happy Days Are Here Again", which he considered to be one of the best songs on her debut album, The Barbra Streisand Album (1963). Concluding, Ruhlmann wrote: "For casual fans, [the album] made for a good sampling of Streisand's most prominent '60s work." As part of Rolling Stones The New Rolling Stone Record Guide, released in 1983, they rated the collection a five out of five stars rating. Streisand's second volume from 1978 and Guilty from 1980 also achieved the same status.

Commercial performance 
Barbra Streisand's Greatest Hits reached the record charts in three countries. In the United States, the compilation debuted at number 77 on the Billboard 200 chart for the week ending February 28, 1970, while also serving as the week's highest new entry. During its fifth week on the chart, it peaked at number 32. Barbra Streisand's Greatest Hits spent a total of 30 weeks on the Billboard 200. It was certified Gold by the Recording Industry Association of America for shipments of 500,000 copies on May 4, 1971, and by November 21, 1986, the record had been certified double Platinum for shipments of two million albums. On the UK Albums Chart, the compilation peaked at number 44, where it became Streisand's second entry altogether, immediately following her sixth studio album, My Name Is Barbra, Two... (1965), which peaked at number six. Elsewhere, the album achieved its highest position in Canada, where it peaked at number 17 on the official Top Albums chart compiled by RPM. Although the compilation did not chart in Australia, the Australian Recording Industry Association (ARIA) certified Barbra Streisand's Greatest Hits Gold in 2000, signifying shipments of at least 35,000 copies.

Track listing

Personnel 
Credits adapted from the liner notes of Barbra Streisand's Greatest Hits.

 Barbra Streisand vocals
 Mike Berniker production 
 Don Costa arranger, conductor
 Jack Gold production 
 Frank Laico recording engineer
 Michel Legrand arranger, conductor

 Peter Matz arranger, conductor
 Robert Mersey production 
 Lawrence Schiller cover photo
 Ettore Stratta production 
 Warren Vincent production , sound supervisor
 Stan Weiss recording engineer

Charts

Certifications

References

Footnotes

Sources

External links 
 
 Barbra Archives - Greatest Hits (1970) 

1970 greatest hits albums
Albums arranged by Don Costa
Albums arranged by Michel Legrand
Albums arranged by Peter Matz
Albums conducted by Don Costa
Albums conducted by Michel Legrand
Albums conducted by Peter Matz
Albums produced by Mike Berniker
Barbra Streisand compilation albums
Columbia Records compilation albums